Daily Globe may refer to:

 Ironwood Daily Globe, a real newspaper based in Ironwood, Michigan, United States.
 Daily Globe (Worthington), a real newspaper in Worthington, Minnesota, United States.
 St. Paul Globe, a former newspaper based in St. Paul, Minnesota, United States.